Atrévete a Soñar (English: Dare to dream) is a Mexican  teen telenovela, produced by Luis de Llano for Televisa, under the license of Ideas del Sur. Atrévete a Soñar is an adaptation of the Argentine telenovela, Patito Feo (Ugly Duckling).

Danna Paola stars as Patito, Eleazar Gómez as Mateo, Violeta Isfel and Cynthia Klitbo, play antagonist roles as Antonella and Bianca. The telenovela also features adult protagonists, René Strickler and Vanessa Guzmán.

It first aired on March 8, 2009, as the first telenovela to debut on a Sunday in Mexico.  After a year of success, becoming a major hit in Mexico, especially among children, its final episode was on  March 7, 2010, also a Sunday.

Plot
Ana takes charge of the cafeteria at the neighborhood high school called el(the) CAMP and lives in the same establishment in which el(the) CAMP is located. There Patito comes to study and soon meets a group of new friends.  She also makes enemies with a group of other girls.  Her entrance to the high school brings before her a yet unknown reality: that of prejudices, qualms, and discrimination.  To the leaders of the high school, headed by the frivolous Antonella, daughter of Bianca, Patito is an ugly duckling, and direct at her all their mockery and tricks.  Here she meets her prince, Mateo.

Patito becomes the leader of Las Populares (The Populars), sensible young ladies who do not want to be "bimbos" like Las Divinas (The Divines) who only care about power and appearances.  The fight gets serious when the high school decides to participate in an intercollegiate musical contest.  The goal is to represent the school, but Las Populares and Las Divinas do not agree with each other.  There is only one way: a competition that decides who will sing in public. Las Divinas think they have it in the bag, but Patito ruins their plans.  Las Populares with the help of Patito who, despite her shyness to sing in public, with the help of Rodrigo succeed in winning the contest. Throughout the school year, Las Populares and Las Divinas wage a battle tinged with adventure, tricks, and adversities.

Six months after the before-mentioned, Ana has another baby (the son of Rodrigo) and Patito has changed her look thanks to her grandmother. She finds herself caught in an amorous discord on account of Giovanni, a newcomer to the community (but not a student at CAMP). Giovanni's arrival represents immediate competition to Mateo and all the other CAMP boys, yet he becomes Antonella's ally as she attempts to take Patito out of the Divinas' way. Meanwhile, Rodrigo wants to spend as much time as possible with his children and wife and great surprises await throughout the second chapter: a woman who will tell Bianca how to get a hold of Ana's body and get her out of her life; the return of Amaya's biological mother; Patito's quinceañera (a 15th birthday celebration, like a Sweet Sixteen); and the arrival of new loves, great friends and mortal enemies.

Patito comes to celebrate her 15th birthday, but Antonella wants to ruin her party.  Antonella contrives a plot where she rigs a bucket, behind the scenes, that contains chicken gizzards. Antonella's father catches her and begs her to reconsider, warning her that if she chooses to go down this path it will have dire life consequences.  Antonella reconsiders and has a change of heart without ceasing to divine.

Later, Mateo wants to dedicate a song to Patito, but Giovanni plans to do the same—he's stolen Mateo's song.  Antonella, who knew Giovanni's plan, tells Mateo everything, and he knocks Giovanni out on stage, leaving him unconscious.  Mateo finally sings the song with the K&B.

Patito and Mateo get together during the performance of the CAMP students where she asks him to be her boyfriend.  Antonella asks Patito to forgive her for all the bad she's done.  Patito tells her that she has nothing to forgive, that for her, they were always friends and they return to being so.
Antonella becomes Johnny's girlfriend again. Finally, they show the viewer what their future was like and what they did, but they don't actually act it out.
At the end of the final episode, is at Patito 15 party and she sings "Mundo de Caramelo" and that becomes The End.

Cast

Soundtrack 
Studio albums
 Atrévete a soñar (2009)
 Atrévete a soñar 2 (2009)

Compilations
 Atrévete a soñar 1.5 (2009)

DVDs
 Viviendo Atrévete a soñar (2009)

Live albums
 Atrévete a soñar: El concierto (2010)

Awards

References

External links 
 

2009 telenovelas
2009 Mexican television series debuts
2010 Mexican television series endings
Mexican telenovelas
Children's telenovelas
Televisa telenovelas
Spanish-language telenovelas
Mexican children's television series
Teen telenovelas
Television series about teenagers